Phacusa khasiana is a moth of the family Zygaenidae. It was described by Frederic Moore in 1879. It is found in Assam, India.

References

Moths described in 1879
Procridinae